A Little Bit of Soul (Ovo malo duše) is a 1987 Bosnian television dramedy film written by Ranko Božić and directed by Ademir Kenović.

Plot
A bitter coming-of-age story about a boy who grows up in a remote Bosnian village shortly after World War II.

Cast
Branko Đurić – Ibrahim
Zaim Muzaferija – Jusuf
Boro Stjepanović – Poštar/Mailman
Snježana Sinovčić – Hanifa
Saša Petrović – Latif
Branka Bajić – Senada
Davor Janjić – Nihad

Production
A Little Bit of Soul was filmed in 1986.

References

External links

1987 films
1987 comedy-drama films
Bosnia and Herzegovina comedy-drama films
Yugoslav comedy-drama films
Bosnian-language films